The Favorskii rearrangement is principally a rearrangement of cyclopropanones and α-halo ketones that leads to carboxylic acid derivatives. In the case of cyclic α-halo ketones, the Favorskii rearrangement constitutes a ring contraction. This rearrangement takes place in the presence of a base, sometimes hydroxide, to yield a carboxylic acid but most of the time either an alkoxide base or an amine to yield an ester or an amide, respectively.  α,α'-Dihaloketones eliminate HX under the reaction conditions to give α,β-unsaturated carbonyl compounds.

History
The reaction is named for the Russian chemist Alexei Yevgrafovich Favorskii

Reaction mechanism

The reaction mechanism is thought to involve the formation of an enolate on the side of the ketone away from the chlorine atom. This enolate cyclizes to a cyclopropanone intermediate which is then attacked by the hydroxide nucleophile.

The second step has also been proposed to be stepwise process, with chloride anion leaving first to produce a zwitterionic oxyallyl cation before a disrotatory electrocyclic ring closure takes place to afford the cyclopropanone intermediate.  

Usage of alkoxide anions such as sodium methoxide, instead of sodium hydroxide, yields the ring-contracted ester product.  

When enolate formation is impossible, the Favorskii rearrangement takes place by an alternate mechanism, in which addition to hydroxide to the ketone takes place, followed by concerted collapse of the tetrahedral intermediate and migration of the neighboring carbon with displacement of the halide.  This is sometimes known as the pseudo-Favorskii rearrangement, although previous to labeling studies, it was thought that all Favorskii rearrangements proceeded through this mechanism.

Wallach degradation
In the related Wallach degradation (Otto Wallach, 1918) not one but two halogen atoms flank the ketone resulting in a new contracted ketone after oxidation and decarboxylation

Photo-Favorskii reaction
The reaction type also exists as a photochemical reaction. The photo-Favorskii reaction has been used in the photochemical unlocking of certain phosphates (for instance those of ATP) protected by so-called p-hydroxyphenacyl groups. The deprotection proceeds through a triplet diradical (3) and a dione spiro intermediate (4) although the latter has thus far eluded detection.

See also
 Syntheses of cubane proceed by Favorskii rearrangements:

 Trimethylenemethane cycloaddition, which can proceed via a similar mechanism

Further reading

References

Rearrangement reactions
Name reactions
Ring contraction reactions